Wayne is an unincorporated community in Marengo County, Alabama, United States.  Wayne had a post office at one time, but it no longer exists.

Geography

References

Unincorporated communities in Alabama
Unincorporated communities in Marengo County, Alabama